The Church of St Agnes and St Pancras is in Ullet Road, Toxteth Park, Liverpool, England. It is recorded in the National Heritage List for England as a designated Grade I listed building, and is an active Anglican church in the diocese of Liverpool, the archdeaconry of Liverpool and the deanery of Toxteth and Wavertree. Pevsner described it as "by far the most beautiful Victorian church of Liverpool...an epitome of Late Victorian nobility in church design".

History

The church was built between 1883 and 1885 at a cost of £28,000 (equivalent to £ in ), which was paid for by the stockbroker H. Douglas Horsfall. The architect was John Loughborough Pearson.

Present day
The parish stands in the Anglo-Catholic tradition of the Church of England. As it rejects the ordination of women, it receives alternative episcopal oversight from the Bishop of Beverley (currently Glyn Webster).

Architecture

Exterior
The church is built in red brick with red sandstone dressings and a tile roof. Its plan consists of a four-bay nave with lean-to aisles and a clerestory, transepts at both ends, a south chapel with lean-to aisles, a short chancel with a canted polygonal apse, and an ambulatory which is flanked by turrets. At the west end are two porches. The west end and the transepts have angle buttresses and gable crosses. Over the east crossing is a lead-covered flèche. The windows are either lancets or have plate tracery.

Interior
The interior of the church is lined with Caen stone. The northwest transept contains the baptistry with a marble font carved by Nathaniel Hitch, who also worked with Pearson in Truro Cathedral. The nave has arcades with round piers and balconies above. The northeast transept contains the organ loft which consists of a polygonal platform supported by a central column of black marble surrounded by ten more columns around the edges. The south chapel is the Lady Chapel. Its screen of 1904 and reredos of 1904 were designed by G. F. Bodley. The ambulatory runs round the apse and is divided from the sanctuary by an arcade with statues of angel musicians in the spandrels. Above this is a frieze in high relief depicting the Adoration of the Lamb, and above this are statues of angels under canopies. The high altar reredos was carved by Nathaniel Hitch, as were the apse carvings. The pulpit is carved in Italian marble and depicts the Apostles and Church Fathers. The stained glass includes windows by Kempe and Herbert Bryans. The original pipe organ originally built by Wordsworth and Maskell of Leeds, has been unusable since 1996. The fine case and majority of the pipework survive in situ, for restoration should a funds be later made available. The console has been removed and replaced by that of an electronic organ which was made by Hugh Banton.

Associated buildings

Behind the church is the vicarage which was built between 1885 and 1887 to a design by Norman Shaw and paid for by H. Douglas Horsfall's mother. It is built in red brick with stone dressings and has two storeys. Its windows are arranged asymmetrically and include a canted oriel window on the street elevation. The vicarage is a Grade II* listed building. Also behind the church and attached to it by a passage is the church hall. It was built probably in 1887 and is also by Shaw. The hall is built in red brick with a tile roof. Its main part has a clerestory and lean-to aisles, and behind this is a smaller single-story room with windows containing tracery. It is listed at Grade II.

See also

Grade I listed buildings in Merseyside
Grade I listed churches in Merseyside
List of new ecclesiastical buildings by J. L. Pearson

References

Church of St Agnes and St Pancras
Churches in Liverpool
Grade I listed churches in Merseyside
Anglican Diocese of Liverpool
Church of England church buildings in Merseyside
Churches completed in 1885
19th-century Church of England church buildings
J. L. Pearson buildings
Anglo-Catholic church buildings in Merseyside
Anglo-Catholic churches in England receiving AEO